Ugarit News (Arabic: أوغاريت الاخبارية) is an online Syrian rebel news outlet reporting on the Syrian conflict in both Arabic and English. Ugarit News posts videos on its YouTube channels as well as daily reports and breaking news via Twitter and Facebook.

References

External links
 YouTube channels
 Twitter
 Facebook

News agencies based in Syria